The Mirror may refer to:

Books and publications 
 The Mirror, a book by T. B. Joshua
 The Mirror, a novelette by Nancy Farmer
 "The Mirror", a short story by Eiko Kadono
 "The Mirror", a short story by Raphael Soyer
 The Mirror (novel), a 1978 horror novel by Marlys Millhiser

Newspapers
 Daily Mirror, a UK tabloid newspaper
 Montreal Mirror, a Quebec alternative weekly, 1985-2012
 The Mirror, a media and political gossip blog written by Betsy Rothstein on The Daily Caller
 The Fairfield Mirror or The Mirror, the student newspaper for Fairfield University
 The Mirror (UNC newspaper), the student newspaper for the University of Northern Colorado
 The Mirror (Pakistani magazine)
 The Mirror (Western Australia), a weekly newspaper published in Western Australia between 1920 & 1956
 The Mirror of Australia, a newspaper published in Sydney, New South Wales from 1917 to 1919
 The Mirror, the campus newspaper of Lakeland University
 The Mirror, the newspaper of William Penn Charter School
 Kyemon, a Burmese language newspaper
 The Mirror (1779–1780), a short lived literary magazine by Henry Mackenzie

Film and television 
 The Mirror (1913 film), a film by Anthony O'Sullivan
 The Mirror (1914 film), a film starring Charlotte Burton
 The Mirror (1915 film), a short dramatic film directed by Joseph Kaufman
 The Mirror (1917 film), a film starring Marjorie Rambeau
 The Mirror (1943 film) (Spanish:El Espejo), an Argentine drama directed by Francisco Múgica 
 The Mirror (1967 film), a film by Qin Tao
 The Mirror (1975 film), a film by Andrei Tarkovsky
 The Mirror, also known as Aina, a 1977 film by Nazrul Islam
 The Mirror, also known as Aaina, a 1993 film by Deepak Sareen
 The Mirror, also known as Oglinda, a 1993 film by Sergiu Nicolaescu
 The Mirror (1997 film), a film by Jafar Panahi
 The Mirror (1999 film), a film by Siu Wing
 The Mirror (2005 film), a film starring Robert Sedgwick
 The Mirror (2014 film), a British film
 The Mirror (2015 film), a Chinese-South Korean film
 "The Mirror" (The Twilight Zone), a 1961 episode of The Twilight Zone

Music 
 The Mirror (Spooky Tooth album), a 1974 rock album by the British band Spooky Tooth
 The Mirror (Ja Rule album), an album by Ja Rule
 The Mirror, an album by Raul Midón
 "The Mirror", a song by Dream Theater from Awake

See also
 Der Spiegel, a German newspaper
 Mirror (disambiguation)